Interstate 35 (I-35) in Texas is a major north–south Interstate Highway running from Laredo near the Mexican border to the Red River north of Gainesville where it crosses into Oklahoma. Along its route, it passes through the cities of San Antonio, Austin, and Waco before it splits into two auxiliary routes just north of Hillsboro. I-35E heads northeast where it passes through Dallas. I-35W turns northwest to run through Fort Worth. The two branches meet up in Denton to again form I-35, where it continues to the Oklahoma border. The exit numbers for I-35E maintain the sequence of exit numbers from the southern segment of I-35, and the northern segment of I-35 follows on from the sequence of exit numbers from I-35E. I-35W maintains its own sequence of exit numbers.

It does include the  segment of I-35E. Texas contains more miles of the overall length of I-35 than any other state, almost one-third of the entire length.

The Interstate is currently undergoing an extensive renovation and expansion project, known as 'My35'. The project includes work on portions of the Interstate from Dallas south to Laredo. Once complete, the highway will span three lanes in each direction from Hillsboro to San Antonio.

Route description 
I-35 has been designated the Texas portion of the Purple Heart Trail. Signage noting this designation is being added along the route.

Laredo and South Texas 
In Laredo, I-35 is between six and eight mainlanes in each direction, dropping to four near milemarker 13. The highway passes through the towns of Cotulla, Dilley, Pearsall, Devine, and Lytle before reaching San Antonio.

San Antonio 

In San Antonio, I-35 is listed as the PanAm Expressway. It starts out as four lanes from the south until it reaches State Highway 422 Spur (Spur 422, Poteet-Jourdanton Freeway), expanding to six to eight mainlanes of travel. Its southern point begins in the southwest corner of town and travels northeast, crossing I-410 near its southwest point. At the southwest corner of Downtown, it reaches an intersection with I-10, US 87, and US 90. US 90 continues east and west from this junction, while I-10 westbound/US 87 northbound joins with I-35 northbound along the westside of Downtown. In this section, it splits lanes to form two levels, a lower one for local traffic and a higher one for express traffic. They briefly rejoin near the northwest corner of Downtown to allow I-10/US 87 to split off and go northwest.

I-35 continues, resplitting lanes again as it curves around the northwest corner of Downtown and turns east. It rejoins the lanes as it goes through an intersection at the northeast corner of Downtown, where I-37's northern terminus is located, while US 281 will continue on the north–south freeway. I-35 continues east for a few miles until it begins to curve back to the northeast. It merges with I-410 on its eastern north–south leg from its northbound direction in a triangular interchange and continues north concurrently from there. A few miles later, I-410 will split off onto its northern west–east leg, while I-35 resumes its north-northeast course past the northeast corner of the city.

Trucks are restricted from travel in the far left lane of I-35 in either direction throughout the San Antonio area. The restriction covers Bexar, Guadalupe, and Comal counties.

Austin 

In Austin, I-35 is named Interregional Highway. Through most of the greater Austin area, I-35 is three to four lanes in each direction, dropping to three lanes north of Williamson County. It forms the eastern boundary of Downtown Austin and also passes through the eastside of the University of Texas campus. The freeway divides the prosperous downtown from the historically Black neighborhoods of East Austin. I-35 is cosigned with US 290 through central Austin.

Trucks are restricted from travel in the far left lane of I-35 in either direction throughout the Austin area. The restriction covers Hays and Travis counties and most of Williamson County and ends north of Jarrell, where I-35 is reduced to three lanes in each direction.

I-35 is split into two decks between Farm to Market Road 969 (FM 969, Martin Luther King Jr. Boulevard) and Airport Boulevard, north of Downtown Austin. Both the upper and lower decks are signed as I-35 and US 290, and they use a common set of exit numbers, with some exit numbers duplicated between the two decks. The upper deck lanes are express lanes, with no on- or offramps. Drivers wishing to exit between FM 969 and Airport Boulevard must use the lower deck.

The I-35 corridor between San Antonio and Austin is considered one of the most congested stretches of highway in the Interstate System. Much of this traffic is due to I-35 being considered one of the primary NAFTA corridors. Efforts to alleviate the congestion include State Highway 130 (SH 130), which forms an I-35 bypass loop to the east of Austin. Many local and regional governance organizations have ongoing studies on other methods to improve mobility on I-35, which include such features as commuter rail lines and additional managed lanes.

Waco and Central Texas 

In Waco, I-35 is known as the Jack Kultgen Freeway. I-35 has six to eight lanes through the city of Waco. It passes just to the west of the Baylor University campus and crosses the Brazos River adjacent to McLane Stadium, the new home of Baylor Bears football. Beginning in Waco and continuing up until just before the I-35E/I-35W split north of Hillsboro, I-35 is cosigned with US 77.

Dallas and Fort Worth

Denton and North Texas 

Just southwest of Denton, I-35W and I-35E join to reform I-35, which then continues north to the Oklahoma border. The exit numbers on I-35 continue on from the last exit of I-35E.

Just north of Denton, US 77 is cosigned with I-35 through to the Oklahoma border, although it is not signed as such.

History

Central Texas 
The right-of-way for the future I-35 in Austin began being purchased in 1946, running along the so-called "inter-regional highway" (named for the precursor to the current Interstate Highway System). The formal opening of I-35 in Austin took place in 1962. The alignment was chosen to line up with US 81 and with East Avenue, which formed the eastern boundary of downtown Austin and separated it from East Austin. US 81 has since been truncated and does not extend to Austin, and East Avenue today forms part of the frontage road for I-35 through downtown Austin.

A  hole was drilled into the space and an engineer was lowered into the hole for exploration. Later, the Texas Speleological Association mapped the cavity, and the Texas highway department sealed the hole and completed the Interstate.
 
In 1975, a  set of elevated express lanes were added to I-35 between 15th Street and Airport Boulevard. The reason double-decking was used is because the highway is bounded in the area by the University of Texas campus on the west and by the Mount Calvary Cemetery on the east, restricting the available right-of-way. The lower deck kept its original configuration, which featured short on- and offramps with limited visibility. In 2000, some offramps on the lower deck were removed in response to the already dangerous conditions becoming more so as traffic levels on the road increased. I-35, in general, and the double-decked section, in particular, have been viewed as a social dividing line between the central Austin and UT communities and the more economically depressed East Austin neighborhoods.

I-35, at one time, had one of the few at-grade railroad crossings in the Interstate Highway System, near Airport Boulevard in Austin. The crossing was bridged across during the 1970s.

Throughout 2018 to 2021, construction commenced to add three additional flyovers at the intersection of US 183 and I-35. When construction on the southbound I-35 to northbound US 183 flyover was completed, the preexisting northbound I-35 to northbound US 183 flyover was demolished on May 8, 2021, in favor of a replacement flyover completed on September 10, 2021, due to concerns over the latter flyover's incline being too steep for larger vehicles to navigate without delaying other traffic.

The interchange at SH 45 was partially affected by the March 21, 2022 tornado outbreak when a large light pole was ripped off its foundation, the debris resting on the side of a flyover, as seen from photos captured by KXAN-TV.

North Texas 

Construction on I-35 in the Dallas–Fort Worth region began around 1960 with the upgrading of US 77 to Interstate standards between Dallas and Denton. By 1965, I-35 was complete from Dallas to the Oklahoma border, and, by 1967, it was complete from both Dallas and Fort Worth southward to Austin. The remaining segment of I-35W from Fort Worth to Denton was not completed until 1969.

Future

Main Street Texas expansion project 
The Main Street Texas expansion project primarily focuses on expanding the number of main lanes from four to six through McLennan and Bell counties. It also calls for complete replacement of the mainlane bridges over the Brazos River and extensive renovations to frontage roads and interchanges throughout the corridor. Funding for the project was secured in increments, and the first part of the project began in 2010. Construction largely wrapped up in the middle of 2019 with the completion of the Temple segment except for the portion of freeway running through the Downtown Waco area. For that section of the project, $280 million in funding has yet to be secured.

Capital Express expansion project 
The Capital Express project is a  highway expansion in Williamson, Travis, and Hays counties between from SH 45 north to SH 45 southeast. The Texas Department of Transportation (TxDOT) has broken the expansion project into three components: the Capital Express North, Capital Express Central, and Capital Express South projects.

The $500 million Capital Express North project is set to begin construction in late 2022 and runs from SH 45 north to US 290 east, adding one high-occupancy vehicle lane (HOV lane) in each direction, reconstruction of six bridges, and a new diverging diamond interchange at Wells Branch Parkway.

The $4.9 billion Capital Express Central project is to begin in late 2025 and would rebuild the highway in central and Downtown Austin. The plans call for widened mainlanes and frontage roads along with four new managed lanes, totaling up to 20 lanes wide. The project would demolish the double-deck section of the highway between Airport Boulevard and Martin Luther King Jr. Boulevard, as well as the elevated highway between Cesar Chavez Street and East 15th Street. The new highway would be buried below-grade, while some sections may be covered with caps-and-stitches containing parkland; the funding for the caps are not included in the project price tag, but would need to be funded by the Capital Area Metropolitan Planning Organization (CAMPO) and the City of Austin. Approximately 140 residential and commercial properties in the project's footprint would need to be demolished using eminent domain.

The Capital Express project has received pushback from residents and politicians in Austin, who claim that the expansion would displace residents, worsen traffic due to induced demand, and contribute to increased carbon emissions in the city. Critics of the expansion are requesting TxDOT study alternate proposals, including re-routing I-35 traffic along SH 130, or removing the highway and replacing it with an at-grade boulevard through central Austin.

In June 2022, a lawsuit was filed against TxDOT by three Texas organizations—Environment Texas, Rethink35, and Texas Public Interest Research Group—alleging that by dividing the expansion project into three subprojects (The Capital Express North, Central, and South projects, respectively), TxDOT is avoiding "more rigorous, legally required environmental review and public engagement of a single larger project".

Exit list

Auxiliary routes 
I-35 has three auxiliary routes in Texas:
: a branch route of I-35 that runs from a split just north of Hillsboro, passing through Waxahachie, Dallas, and Lewisville before reforming I-35 just west of Denton.
: a branch route of I-35 that runs from a split just north of Hillsboro, passing through Fort Worth before reforming I-35 just west of Denton.
: a partial loop around the northern and eastern boundaries of Dallas. I-635 intersects with I-35E in north Dallas and does not intersect either I-35W or I-35.

Notes

References

External links 

 

 Texas
35
Transportation in Webb County, Texas
Transportation in La Salle County, Texas
Transportation in Frio County, Texas
Transportation in Medina County, Texas
Transportation in Atascosa County, Texas
Transportation in Bexar County, Texas
Transportation in Comal County, Texas
Transportation in Hays County, Texas
Transportation in Travis County, Texas
Transportation in Williamson County, Texas
Transportation in Bell County, Texas
Transportation in Falls County, Texas
Transportation in McLennan County, Texas
Transportation in Hill County, Texas
Transportation in Denton County, Texas
Transportation in Cooke County, Texas